Opelika High School is located in Opelika, Lee County, Alabama and was originally built in 1972. Opelika High School, of the Opelika City Schools, serves students in grades 9–12.  The principal is Kelli Fischer. The school's assistant principals are Courtney Bass, Allison Gregory, Mike Mckee, and Kelvin Philpott.

History

While several private high schools, including two that went by the name "Opelika High School", existed in Opelika as early as the 1860s, the current Opelika High School wasn't founded until 1911. From 1902 to 1911, Opelika offered classes through the 10th grade at the Opelika Public School, but was not able to afford a high school.  A 1907 law called for the formation of a "county high school" in each county run by the county board of education; when the state high school commission looked to establish such a high school in Lee County in 1911, only Opelika applied, and so the school was located there. This school's opening in the fall of 1911 marks the founding of Opelika High School. In 1914, Auburn High School successfully petitioned the state high school commission to take the county flagship status as the "Lee County High School" away from Opelika, starting the two schools long-standing rivalry, and the Opelika school became officially known as "Opelika High School" for the first time, operating as a town school.

Opelika kept the old county high school building until 1917. On Saturday, January 20, 1917, Opelika High School burned to the ground. The two prior private schools in Opelika named "Opelika High School" also burned, in 1867 and in 1894.  For the next year, classes were held in the old Opelika Public School building, until a new structure could be built on the same grounds.  With the new building, Opelika High School was renamed in 1918 Henry G. Clift High School, after the then-mayor of Opelika. Opelika High School football started in 1922, with OHS falling to Alexander City (today Benjamin Russell) 71–0 in both schools' first-ever game. It would be 1925 before Opelika High met Auburn High for the first time on the gridiron, a 21–6 loss; the Bulldogs and Tigers have met each year in football since 1933, with the OHS leading the overall series 42–38–3.

In 1959, Opelika High moved into a new building on Denson Drive and was subsequently renamed "Opelika High School" again. In 1972, OHS moved again, this time into the current facility on LaFayette Parkway.

In August 2014, a $46 million renovation and construction project was completed. The new building contains 87 new classrooms on two floors including seven computer labs.  Each classroom is outfitted with a Promethean interactive whiteboard, projector and ELMO document camera. The business technology labs have with ClearTouch 70” interactive displays that are fully integrated with new educational software. New classrooms include general classrooms for core classes, science labs, an ACCESS computer lab for distance learning and specialty classrooms for Consumer Science, Health Science, Driver's Education, Art, Special Education, Business Tech, Engineering, Publishing and Horticulture. OHS also features a new cafeteria, kitchen and serving area. Following the renovation, the school's Bulldog Stadium now has a turf field, new concession areas, new restrooms and ticket booths. A 22,000 square foot indoor athletic facility including a turf practice field, varsity locker room, coaches' offices and meeting rooms were also built during renovations. Additionally, renovations were also completed for the OHS baseball field, the women's athletic facility, and the girls' and boys' physical education areas.

Publications

Opelika High School students produce a school newspaper called "The Bulldog". The Bulldog includes Editorial, Entertainment, News, Feature, Sports, and Club News sections. The staff sells ads to local businesses to fund the paper, which is printed by Media General.

The high school's yearbook is titled "Zig-Zag."

Perspectives magazine

Students also prepare and distribute a literary-art magazine of student-submitted work called Perspectives. It is published once a year and distributed during the spring semester.  Charles Hannah started the magazine in 1987 as an after-school activity. Since then, Perspectives has become a full class that meets first block every other day. 

Perspectives magazine achievements

Alabama Scholastic Press 
All Alabama: 1997, 2002–04, 2006–08
Superior: 1996, 1999, 2005, 2009–11
Excellent: 2000–01

Alabama Writers Forum 
Certificate of Commendation: 2001
Exceptional Graphic Design: 2002, 2004, 2005, 2007, 2008
Best Overall Literary Content & Graphic Design: 2003

American Scholastic Press 
First Place with Special Merit: 1997–2011
Most Outstanding High School Literary-Art Magazine: 2001, 2003, 2007–08, 2010–11
First Place: 1996

Columbia Scholastic Press 
Gold Medalist Certificate: 1997–99, 2001–11
Silver Medalist Certificate: 2000

NCTE 
Superior: 1997, 1999–2002, 2004, 2007–11
Highest Award: 1996, 1998, 2003, 2005–06

Athletics 

Opelika competes in class 7A of the AHSAA. Its primary athletic rival is the Auburn High School Tigers. The mascot is the bulldog. More specifically, there are 2 bulldogs called "Ope" and "Lika" which represent Opelika High School. The school colors are red and black. The school fields 12 varsity sports teams:
Football
Baseball
Softball
Wrestling
Track and Field (Boys and Girls)
Cross Country (Boys and Girls)
Volleyball (Girls)
Basketball (Boys and Girls)
Soccer (Boys and Girls)
Golf (Boys and Girls)
Tennis (Boys and Girls)
Flag Football (Girls)

Football achievements
2019 Class 6a Region 3 Championship 4th Round Playoffs
2016 Class 6a Region 3 Championship State Runner Up
2015 Class 6a Region 3 Championship 3rd Round Playoffs
2014 Class 6a Region 3 Championship 2nd Round Playoffs
2012 6a State Champion Runner Up
2009 6a State Champion Runner Up
2008 Region 3 AHSAA Championship 
2007 Region 3 AHSAA Championship 
2006 Region 3 Champions 4th Round Payoffs
2005 Region 3 AHSAA Champions 4th Round Playoffs
2004 Region 3 4th Place 1st Round Playoffs
2003 Region 3 Champions 3rd Round Playoffs
2002 Region 3 Champions 3rd Round Playoffs
2001 Region 3 Runner-up 2nd Round Playoffs
2000 Region 3 Runner-up 2nd Round Playoffs
1999 Area 5 Runner-up 2nd Round Playoffs
1998 Area 5 AHSAA Championship
1994 Area 5 1st Round Playoffs
1993 Area 5 3rd Round Playoffs
1992 Area 5 2nd Round Playoffs
1991 Area 5 2nd Round Playoffs
1990 Area 5 1st Round Playoffs
1986 Area 5 Champions 3rd Round Playoffs
1985 Area 5 Champions 1st Round Playoffs
1984 Area 5 1st Round Playoffs

Basketball achievements

Boys
2004 Area 3 3rd Place 1st Round Southeast Sub-Regional
2003 Area 3 Runner-up 1st Round Southeast Sub-Regional
2002 Area 4 Runner-up Quarterfinals Southeast Regional
2001 Area 4 Runner-up 1st Round Southeast Sub-Regional

Track and field achievements

Boys
2021 6A Indoor and Outdoor State Champions
2017 6A Indoor and Outdoor State Champions
2016 6A Indoor and Outdoor State Champions
2015 6A Outdoor State Champions
2007 6A Outdoor State Champions
2006 6A Outdoor State Champions
2004 6A Outdoor State Champions
2003 6A Outdoor State Champions
2000 6A Outdoor State Champions
1999 6A Outdoor State Champions
1998 6A Outdoor State Champions
1997 6A Outdoor Freshman State Champions

Tennis achievements

Boys
1991 6A State Champions 
1979 6A Individual State Champion, Mike Gunter

Wrestling achievements

Team State Champion
1958 (Opelika High School was also known as Clift)

1956 (Opelika High School was also known as Clift)

Other organizations

Opelika High Theatre Society

The Opelika High Theatre Society is known around the region and state for its quality performances.  A play in the fall, an advanced theatre competition at mid-year and a spring musical all attract hundreds from surrounding communities.  In 2014, the cast of The Quilt won "Best Ensemble" and "Best of Show" at the State Trumbauer Theatre Festival. In addition to performances, theatre department courses include set design, set-up and light/sound production.  Past productions include Sweeney Todd, Oliver, Les Misérables, Beauty and the Beast, Our Town, Brighton Beach Memoirs, the Sound of Music and many more.

The Opelika High Theatre Society is under the direction of Mr. Revel Gholston.

Showchoir

Four different choirs are offered by the OHS choral department: the Ovations coed show choir, the Impressions girls’ show choir, Women's Chamber Choir and Chamber Choir.  The show choir groups perform and compete all over the country and have received countless accolades including Grand Champion in the Fame Showchoir America Competition in Washington, D.C., Best Show Design, Best Choreography and Best Vocals awards in numerous competitions, and was the highest ranked Alabama school in the 2009 National Showchoir Ranking System.

The OHS Choral Department is under the direction of Dean Jones and Earvin Comer.

Bands

The Opelika Band program is a source of pride for the Opelika City School System, its students, as well as parents and the entire community.  The band program begins in the 7th grade at Opelika Middle School and continues through the 12th grade at Opelika High School. The band maintains 20% of the student population, almost 350 students.

Beginning in 7th grade, students at Opelika Middle School are encouraged to discover their musical talents in Beginning Band.  Students have the opportunity to “audition” the instruments and become acquainted with the basics of music notation as well as proper technique on the instrument.  
As students progress, they may be invited to become a member of the Concert Band.  This band consists of students who are progressing adequately but may need further instruction before moving into the Symphonic Band.

Students who progress to the 8th grade can become members of the Symphonic Band.  This group is composed of students who have achieved their musical goals in the 7th grade and intend on being a part of the band into high school.  This band has maintained a long history of success whether it is being recognized at Music Performance Assessment or competing in competitive festivals in Orlando, FL.

Opelika Middle School Bands have also featured Percussion Ensembles as the schedule allows.

The Opelika High School Band Program consists of several music ensembles: The Marching band, Wind Ensemble, Symphonic Band, Concert Band, and Jazz Band. There are also two new indoor visual ensembles, the Winter Guard and Indoor Percussion Ensemble and Concert Percussion Ensemble. Below is a brief description of each ensemble.

The Opelika High School Marching Band, also known as “The Spirit of the South” meets and practices during the summer and through the fall semester. With rehearsals after school, this ensemble regularly practices and works towards achieving a high level of musicianship and marching technique. This group performs at every football game and competes at marching competitions throughout the year. The marching band averages 200 students per year and consists of the 8th–12th grade students who play wind or percussion instruments along with a visual ensemble made up of majorettes, color guard, and the “Showstoppers” kickline.  The “Spirit of the South” has traveled to many different destinations throughout the southeast and the nation. Some of the more recent trips and achievements have been multiple trips to Orlando, Philadelphia, and Chicago in 2011 to participate in the St. Patrick's Day Parade.  The “Spirit of the South” has twice performed in Macy's Thanksgiving Day Parade, in 1989 and 1994.

The band is under the direction of Will F. Waggoner. The assistant band director is Mike McGlynn. The OMS band director is under the direction of BreAnna North.

FFA
Opelika High School's FFA includes over 300 members.

Vibe
The Opelika High School vibe is a class that students audition for each position. It features singers, guitar players, bass players, drummers, and a pianist. They perform multiple styles of music from rock to pop and jazz to hip-hop. They were a part of the first annual Troy University Open mic event in 2017. They have concerts each year in the lunchroom, as well as in the OPAC (Opelika Performing Arts Center) auditorium.
   
The vibe is under the direction of Patrick Bruce.

Notable former students
 Mallory Hagan, Miss America 2013
 Robert L. Howard, awarded the Medal of Honor for his service in the Vietnam War.
 William S. Key, Major general during World War II
Lamar Vickerstaff, suspect in the murder of Amore Wiggins
 James S. Voss, astronaut who flew in space five times on board the Space Shuttle and International Space Station.

Professional baseball players

Professional football players

References

Public high schools in Alabama
Educational institutions established in 1911
Schools in Lee County, Alabama
1911 establishments in Alabama